The Río Nahualate is a river in southwest Guatemala Sierra Madre range, in the vicinity of Santa Catarina Ixtahuacán and Nahualá (Sololá). From there it flows southwards through the coastal lowlands of Suchitepéquez and Escuintla to the Pacific Ocean.

References

Rivers of Guatemala